Megan Gallagher (born February 6, 1960) is an American theater and television actress. Having studied at the Juilliard School under the supervision of John Houseman, Gallagher began her career on stage, and has appeared in several Broadway theatre productions, winning a Theatre World Award for her role in A Few Good Men.

From there, Gallagher moved to Los Angeles to pursue acting in film and television; after making a screen debut in George Washington, she graduated to recurring roles in Hill Street Blues and China Beach, and starring roles in The Slap Maxwell Story, The Larry Sanders Show and Millennium. The role of Catherine Black in that series had been written with Gallagher in mind.

Early life
Gallagher was born in Reading, Pennsylvania on February 6, 1960, to Aileen and Donald Gallagher. She was the fifth of six children. Her mother had also been an actor in her youth, retiring when she began a family. Gallagher credits her own career to her mother, who would take her to Broadway theatre productions as a child. She has also cited Mary Tyler Moore and Katharine Hepburn as influences on her career. She attended Wyomissing Area Junior/Senior High School, where she elected not to attend her high school prom in order to continue her rehearsals at a local community theatre, Genesius Theatre.

Gallagher moved to New York to study acting at the Juilliard School under the tutelage of John Houseman. Included in her class were Penny Johnson Jerald, Lorraine Toussaint, Jack Kenny and Jack Stehlin. She then relocated to Los Angeles, California to further pursue her career; during this time she also took on a job taking care of stray cats.

Career
Gallagher began her career on stage, appearing in a production of Paul Osborn Oliver Oliver before being cast in the 1989 Broadway production of Aaron Sorkin's A Few Good Men. Her portrayal of LCDR JoAnne Galloway in the latter production earned her a Theatre World Award, and an Outer Critics Circle Award. In 1993, she took part in Broadway productions of both parts of Angels in America: A Gay Fantasia on National Themes—Millennium Approaches and Perestroika.

Gallagher's television debut was in the miniseries George Washington. She gained the lead role in the pilot At Your Service, and a guest spot in the first episode of L.A. Law. She then went on to appear as a series regular towards the end of Hill Street Blues run, before going on to play a recurring role in China Beach; she still maintains a friendship with China Beach co-star Robert Picardo. Gallagher's role of Catherine Black in Millennium had been written by creator Chris Carter with her in mind specifically, as he had been impressed with her work as Jeannie Sanders on The Larry Sanders Show. Gallagher was also keen to work with Carter, having admired his creation of the character Dana Scully for The X-Files, whom she saw as a positive example of an intriguing female character on television. Gallagher also appeared in the legal drama Suits, acting alongside her Juilliard classmate Wendell Pierce.

Personal life
Gallagher is married to actor Jeff Yagher, and has two children—a pair of twins. She is related by marriage to actress Catherine Hicks and make-up artist Kevin Yagher.

Filmography

Film

Television

Footnotes

References

External links
 

1960 births
Living people
Actors from Reading, Pennsylvania
American film actresses
American stage actresses
American television actresses
Actresses from Pennsylvania
Juilliard School alumni
20th-century American actresses
21st-century American actresses